Zoltán Magyar (born 13 December 1953) was the world's leading pommel horse gymnast in the 1970s. In this event he won two Olympic, three world, three European and two World Cup titles. Magyar had two moves named after him, the Magyar spindle (turning the body in the opposite direction from the circling legs) and the Magyar travel (crosswise circling travel down the horse).

He won the Olympic gold in 1976 and 1980, world championships gold in 1974, 1978 and 1979, European championships gold in 1973, 1975 and 1977; and World Cup gold in 1975 and 1978. His largest margin of victory came at the 1978 World Championships, which he won by 0.375 points. For his achievements he was named Hungarian Sportsman of the year in 1974, 1978 and 1980.

In major all-around competitions, Magyar was ubiquitous but less successful. In Olympic all-around finals, he placed 29th in 1972, ninth in 1976 and ninth in 1980. In world championship all-arounds, he was 15th in 1974, 12th in 1978 and 18th in 1979.

Magyar retired after the 1980 Olympics. Since his departure, he has focused on his lifelong goal as a veterinarian. He currently operates a vet hospital and still resides in Budapest.

In May 2012, Magyar was inducted to the International Gymnastics Hall of Fame.

References

External links

Olympic.org: Zoltan Magyar
Hungarian Olympic Committee

1953 births
Living people
Hungarian male artistic gymnasts
Gymnasts at the 1972 Summer Olympics
Gymnasts at the 1976 Summer Olympics
Gymnasts at the 1980 Summer Olympics
World champion gymnasts
Medalists at the World Artistic Gymnastics Championships
European champions in gymnastics
Olympic gold medalists for Hungary
Olympic medalists in gymnastics
Medalists at the 1980 Summer Olympics
Medalists at the 1976 Summer Olympics
Olympic bronze medalists for Hungary
Gymnasts from Budapest